Finland participated at the 2017 Summer Universiade in Taipei, Taiwan, from 19 to 30 August 2017. The team won one gold medalby Ari-Pekka Liukkonen in the men's 50 metre freestyle swimming eventand three other medals in athletics events.

Medals

Team 

Athletes were selected by the High Performance Unit of the Finnish Olympic Committee. Criterium was the potential to place in the top 16 in an individual event or the top 8 in a team event.

The first 41 nominations were published on 19 June 2017. The complete team, except the men's basketball team, was published on 27 July 2017. The basketball team was published on 13 August 2017.

Chef de Mission: Jukka Tirri

Archery

Athletics

Track and road 

Legend: PB = personal best, SB = season best, Q = qualified by place, q = qualified by time

Field 

Legend: q = qualified by performance, PB = personal best

Combined

Basketball 

Legend: (C) = captain, G = guard, C = centre, F = forward, W = win, L = loss

Fencing

Men

Legend: Q = qualified, E = eliminated, L = loss, W = win

Women

Legend: W = win, L = loss, Q = qualified

Gymnastics

Artistic 
In both genders, the individual qualification will also act as the team all-around event final.

Men

Individual events 

Legend: FX = score and rank in floor exercise, PH = score and rank in pommel horse, RG = score and rank in rings, VT = score and rank in vault, PB = score and rank in parallel bars, HB = score and rank in horizontal bar, Q = qualified, R = reserve

Team all-around 

Legend: FX = score in floor exercise, PH = score in pommel horse, RG = score in rings, VT = score in vault, PB = score in parallel bars, HB = score in horizontal bar, parentheses indicate a non-counting score

Women

Individual events 

Legend: VT = score and rank in vault, UB = score and rank in uneven bars, BB = score and rank in balance beam, FX = score and rank in floor exercise, R = reserve, Q = qualified

Team all-around 

Legend: VT = score in vault, UB = score in uneven bars, BB = score in balance beam, FX = score in floor exercise

Rhythmic

Women's individual

Judo 

Legend: W = win, L = loss

Swimming

Men

Legend: Q = classified for the next round

Women

Taekwondo

Kyorugi

Legend: L = loss

Poomsae

Volleyball 

Legend: C = team captain, S = setter player, OH = outside hitter, MB = middle blocker, OP = opposite player, LI = libero, W = win, L = loss

Weightlifting

References

External links 
 NUSF Overview — Finland

Finland at the Summer Universiade
2017 in Finnish sport
Nations at the 2017 Summer Universiade